IMSI may refer to:

 International mobile subscriber identity
 Intracytoplasmic morphologically selected sperm injection
 Interface Marketing Supplier Integration Institute, standards organization
 Idaho Maximum Security Institution, prison
 International Maple Syrup Institute, see maple syrup
 IMSI/Design, a software company, see List of CAx companies